Vladimir Vladimirovich Shcherbachov (Shcherbachyov, Shcherbachev)  (24 January 1889, in Warsaw – 5 March 1952, in Leningrad) was a Soviet composer.

He studied with Maximilian Steinberg, Anatoly Lyadov, and Jāzeps Vītols (Joseph Wihtol) at the St. Petersburg Conservatory from 1908 to 1914. While there he also worked as a pianist for Sergey Diaghilev and taught theory. He served in World War I and then worked in Soviet government music positions. In 1918-1923 he worked as a lecturer and ran the musical department of the Narkompros. He later became a professor at the Leningrad Conservatory (1923-1931 and 1944-1948) and the Tbilisi Conservatory. He counted Boris Arapov, Vasily Velikanov, Evgeny Mravinsky, Valery Zhelobinsky, Gavriil Popov, Valerian Bogdanov-Berezovsky, Pyotr Ryazanov, and Mikhail Chulaki among his pupils, as well as various others.

Works
Anna Kolossova, opera (1939, unfinished); 
Tabachny Kapitan, operetta (1943);
 Five symphonies: 
No. 1 (1914); 
No. 2 ("Blokovskaya” or "Blok", with soloists and chorus, 1925); 
No. 3 (Symphony-Suite, 1931); 
No. 4 ("Izhorskaya", with soloists and chorus, 1935); 
No. 5 ("Russkaya", 1948, 2nd version in 1950);
Nonet for 7 instruments, voice and dancer (1919);
Suite for string quartet (1939) and other chamber music;
Two piano sonatas and other piano works; 
Various Romances;
Film music:
The Thunderstorm (after Aleksandr Ostrovsky, 1934); 
Peter I (1937-1939);
Polkovodets Suvorov (1941);
Two Suites:
 The Thunderstorm
Peter I;

References 

 Don Randel, The Harvard Biographical Dictionary of Music. Harvard, 1996, p. 831.
 Genrich Orlov, Vladmir Vladimirovich Shcherbachov (Leningrad, 1959)

External links
 Vladimir Shcherbachov on IMDb
 

1889 births
1952 deaths
20th-century classical composers
Russian male classical composers
Russian opera composers
Male opera composers
Soviet composers
Soviet male composers
20th-century Russian male musicians